The Dunkirk evacuation, codenamed Operation Dynamo and also known as the Miracle of Dunkirk, or just Dunkirk, was the evacuation of more than 338,000 Allied soldiers during the Second World War from the beaches and harbour of Dunkirk, in the north of France, between 26 May and 4 June 1940. The operation commenced after large numbers of Belgian, British, and French troops were cut off and surrounded by German troops during the six-week Battle of France. In a speech to the House of Commons, British Prime Minister Winston Churchill called this "a colossal military disaster", saying "the whole root and core and brain of the British Army" had been stranded at Dunkirk and seemed about to perish or be captured. In his "We shall fight on the beaches" speech on 4 June, he hailed their rescue as a "miracle of deliverance".

After Germany invaded Poland in September 1939, France and the British Empire declared war on Germany and imposed an economic blockade. The British Expeditionary Force (BEF) was sent to help defend France. After the Phoney War of October 1939 to April 1940, Germany invaded Belgium, the Netherlands, and France on 10 May 1940. Three panzer corps attacked through the Ardennes and drove northwest to the English Channel. By 21 May, German forces had trapped the BEF, the remains of the Belgian forces, and three French field armies along the northern coast of France. BEF commander General Viscount Gort immediately saw evacuation across the Channel as the best course of action, and began planning a withdrawal to Dunkirk, the closest good port.

Late on 23 May, a halt order was issued by Generaloberst Gerd von Rundstedt, commander of Army Group A. Adolf Hitler approved this order the next day, and had the German High Command send confirmation to the front. Attacking the trapped BEF, French, and Belgian armies was left to the Luftwaffe until the order was rescinded on 26 May. This gave Allied forces time to construct defensive works and pull back large numbers of troops to fight the Battle of Dunkirk. From 28 to 31 May, in the siege of Lille, the remaining 40,000 men of the French First Army fought a delaying action against seven German divisions, including three armoured divisions.

On the first day, only 7,669 Allied soldiers were evacuated, but by the end of the eighth day, 338,226 had been rescued by a hastily assembled fleet of over 800 vessels. Many troops were able to embark from the harbour's protective mole onto 39 British Royal Navy destroyers, four Royal Canadian Navy destroyers, at least three French Navy destroyers, and a variety of civilian merchant ships. Others had to wade out from the beaches, waiting for hours in shoulder-deep water. Some were ferried to the larger ships by what became known as the Little Ships of Dunkirk, a flotilla of hundreds of merchant marine boats, fishing boats, pleasure craft, yachts, and lifeboats called into service from Britain. The BEF lost 68,000 soldiers during the French campaign and had to abandon nearly all of its tanks, vehicles, and equipment. In his 4 June speech, Churchill also reminded the country that "we must be very careful not to assign to this deliverance the attributes of a victory. Wars are not won by evacuations."

Background

In September 1939, after Germany invaded Poland, the United Kingdom sent the British Expeditionary Force (BEF) to aid in the defence of France, landing at Cherbourg, Nantes, and Saint-Nazaire. By May 1940 the force consisted of ten divisions in three corps under the command of General John Vereker, 6th Viscount Gort. Working with the BEF were the Belgian Army and the French First, Seventh, and Ninth Armies.

During the 1930s, the French had constructed the Maginot Line, a series of fortifications along their border with Germany. This line had been designed to deter a German invasion across the Franco-German border and funnel an attack into Belgium, which could then be met by the best divisions of the French Army. Thus, any future war would take place outside of French territory, avoiding a repeat of the First World War. The area immediately to the north of the Maginot Line was covered by the heavily wooded Ardennes region, which French General Philippe Pétain declared to be "impenetrable" as long as "special provisions" were taken. He believed that any enemy force emerging from the forest would be vulnerable to a pincer attack and destroyed. The French commander-in-chief, Maurice Gamelin, also believed the area to be of a limited threat, noting that it "never favoured large operations". With this in mind, the area was left lightly defended.

The initial plan for the German invasion of France called for an encirclement attack through the Netherlands and Belgium, avoiding the Maginot Line. Erich von Manstein, then Chief of Staff of the German Army Group A, prepared the outline of a different plan and submitted it to the Oberkommando des Heeres (OKH; German High Command) via his superior, Generaloberst Gerd von Rundstedt. Manstein's plan suggested that panzer divisions should attack through the Ardennes, then establish bridgeheads on the Meuse River and rapidly drive to the English Channel. The Germans would thus cut off the Allied armies in Belgium. This part of the plan later became known as the Sichelschnitt ("sickle cut"). Adolf Hitler approved a modified version of Manstein's ideas, today known as the Manstein Plan, after meeting with him on 17 February.

On 10 May, Germany invaded Belgium and the Netherlands. Army Group B, under Generaloberst Fedor von Bock, attacked into Belgium, while the three panzer corps of Army Group A under Rundstedt swung around to the south and drove for the Channel. The BEF advanced from the Belgian border to positions along the River Dyle within Belgium, where they fought elements of Army Group B starting on 10 May. They were ordered to begin a fighting withdrawal to the Scheldt River on 14 May when the Belgian and French positions on their flanks failed to hold. During a visit to Paris on 17 May, Prime Minister Winston Churchill was astonished to learn from Gamelin that the French had committed all their troops to the ongoing engagements and had no strategic reserves. On 19 May, Gort met with French General Gaston Billotte, commander of the French First Army and overall coordinator of the Allied forces. Billotte revealed that the French had no troops between the Germans and the sea. Gort immediately saw that evacuation across the Channel was the best course of action, and began planning a withdrawal to Dunkirk, the closest location with good port facilities. Surrounded by marshes, Dunkirk boasted old fortifications and the longest sand beach in Europe, where large groups could assemble. On 20 May, on Churchill's suggestion, the Admiralty began arranging for all available small vessels to be made ready to proceed to France. After continued engagements and a failed Allied attempt on 21 May at Arras to cut through the German spearhead, the BEF was trapped, along with the remains of the Belgian forces and the three French armies, in an area along the coast of northern France and Belgium.

Prelude

Without informing the French, the British began planning on 20 May for Operation Dynamo, the evacuation of the BEF. This planning was headed by Vice Admiral Bertram Ramsay at the naval headquarters below Dover Castle, from which he briefed Churchill as it was under way. Ships began gathering at Dover for the evacuation. On 20 May, the BEF sent Brigadier Gerald Whitfield to Dunkirk to start evacuating unnecessary personnel. Overwhelmed by what he later described as "a somewhat alarming movement towards Dunkirk by both officers and men", due to a shortage of food and water, he had to send many along without thoroughly checking their credentials. Even officers ordered to stay behind to aid the evacuation disappeared onto the boats.

On 22 May, Churchill ordered the BEF to attack southward in coordination with the French First Army under General Georges Blanchard to reconnect with the remainder of the French forces. This proposed action was dubbed the Weygand Plan after General Maxime Weygand, appointed Supreme Commander after Gamelin's dismissal on 18 May. On 25 May, Gort had to abandon any hope of achieving this objective and withdrew on his own initiative, along with Blanchard's forces, behind the Lys Canal, part of a canal system that reached the sea at Gravelines. Sluice gates had already been opened all along the canal to flood the system and create a barrier (the Canal Line) against the German advance.

Battle of Dunkirk

By 24 May, the Germans had captured the port of Boulogne and surrounded Calais. The engineers of the 2nd Panzer Division under Generalmajor Rudolf Veiel built five bridges over the Canal Line and only one British battalion barred the way to Dunkirk. On 23 May, at the suggestion of Fourth Army commander Generalfeldmarschall Günther von Kluge, Rundstedt had ordered the panzer units to halt, concerned about the vulnerability of his flanks and the question of supply to his forward troops. He was also concerned that the marshy ground around Dunkirk would prove unsuitable for tanks and he wished to conserve them for later operations (in some units, tank losses were 30–50 per cent). Hitler was also apprehensive, and on a visit to Army Group A headquarters on 24 May, he endorsed the order.

Air Marshal Hermann Göring urged Hitler to let the Luftwaffe (aided by Army Group B) finish off the British, to the consternation of General Franz Halder, who noted in his diary that the Luftwaffe was dependent upon the weather and aircrews were worn out after two weeks of battle. Rundstedt issued another order, which was sent uncoded. It was picked up by the Royal Air Force (RAF) Y service intelligence network at 12:42: "By order of the Fuhrer ... attack north-west of Arras is to be limited to the general line Lens–Bethune–Aire–St Omer–Gravelines. The Canal will not be crossed." Later that day, Hitler issued Directive 13, which called for the Luftwaffe to defeat the trapped Allied forces and stop their escape. At 15:30 on 26 May, Hitler ordered the panzer groups to continue their advance, but most units took another 16 hours to attack. The delay gave the Allies time to prepare defences vital for the evacuation and prevented the Germans from stopping the Allied retreat from Lille.

The halt order has been the subject of much discussion by historians. Guderian considered the failure to order a timely assault on Dunkirk to be one of the major German mistakes on the Western Front. Rundstedt called it "one of the great turning points of the war", and Manstein described it as "one of Hitler's most critical mistakes". B. H. Liddell Hart interviewed many of the generals after the war and put together a picture of Hitler's strategic thinking on the matter. Hitler believed that once Britain's troops left continental Europe, they would never return.

Evacuation

26–27 May

The retreat was undertaken amid chaotic conditions, with abandoned vehicles blocking the roads and a flood of refugees heading in the opposite direction. Due to wartime censorship and the desire to keep up British morale, the full extent of the unfolding disaster at Dunkirk was not initially publicised. A special service attended by King George VI was held in Westminster Abbey on 26 May, which was declared a national day of prayer. The Archbishop of Canterbury led prayers "for our soldiers in dire peril in France". Similar prayers were offered in synagogues and churches throughout the UK that day, confirming to the public their suspicion of the desperate plight of the troops. Just before 19:00 on 26 May, Churchill ordered Dynamo to begin, by which time 28,000 men had already departed. Initial plans called for the recovery of 45,000 men from the BEF within two days, at which time German troops were expected to block further evacuation. Only 25,000 men escaped during this period, including 7,669 on the first day.

On 27 May, the first full day of the evacuation, one cruiser, eight destroyers, and 26 other craft were active. Admiralty officers combed nearby boatyards for small craft that could ferry personnel from the beaches out to larger craft in the harbour, as well as larger vessels that could load from the docks. An emergency call was put out for additional help, and by 31 May nearly four hundred small craft were voluntarily and enthusiastically taking part in the effort.

The same day, the Luftwaffe heavily bombed Dunkirk, both the town and the dock installations. As the water supply was knocked out, the resulting fires could not be extinguished. An estimated one thousand civilians were killed, one-third of the remaining population of the town. RAF squadrons were ordered to provide air supremacy for the Royal Navy during evacuation. Their efforts shifted to covering Dunkirk and the English Channel, protecting the evacuation fleet. The Luftwaffe was met by 16 squadrons of the RAF, who claimed 38 kills on 27 May while losing 14 aircraft. Many more RAF fighters sustained damage and were subsequently written off. On the German side, Kampfgeschwader 2 (KG 2) and KG 3 suffered the heaviest casualties. German losses amounted to 23 Dornier Do 17s. KG 1 and KG 4 bombed the beach and harbour and KG 54 sank the 8,000-ton steamer Aden. Junkers Ju 87 Stuka dive bombers sank the troopship Cote d' Azur. The Luftwaffe engaged with 300 bombers which were protected by 550 fighter sorties and attacked Dunkirk in twelve raids. They dropped 15,000 high explosive and 30,000 incendiary bombs, destroying the oil tanks and wrecking the harbour. No. 11 Group RAF flew 22 patrols with 287 aircraft this day, in formations of up to 20 aircraft.

Altogether, over 3,500 sorties were flown in support of Operation Dynamo. The RAF continued to inflict a heavy toll on the German bombers throughout the week. Soldiers being bombed and strafed while awaiting transport were for the most part unaware of the efforts of the RAF to protect them, as most of the dogfights took place far from the beaches. As a result, many British soldiers bitterly accused the airmen of doing nothing to help, reportedly leading to some army troops accosting and insulting RAF personnel once they returned to England.

On 25 and 26 May, the Luftwaffe focused their attention on Allied pockets holding out at Calais, Lille, and Amiens, and did not attack Dunkirk. Calais, held by the BEF, surrendered on 26 May. Remnants of the French First Army, surrounded at Lille, fought off seven German divisions, several of them armoured, until 31 May, when the remaining 35,000 soldiers were forced to surrender after running out of food and ammunition. The Germans accorded the honours of war to the defenders of Lille in recognition of their bravery.

28 May – 4 June

The Belgian Army surrendered on 28 May, leaving a large gap to the east of Dunkirk. Several British divisions were rushed in to cover that side. The Luftwaffe flew fewer sorties over Dunkirk on 28 May, switching their attention to the Belgian ports of Ostend and Nieuwpoort. The weather over Dunkirk was not conducive to dive or low-level bombing. The RAF flew 11 patrols and 321 sorties, claiming 23 destroyed for the loss of 13 aircraft. On 28 May, 17,804 soldiers arrived at British ports.

On 29 May, 47,310 British troops were rescued as the Luftwaffes Ju 87s exacted a heavy toll on shipping. The British destroyer HMS Grenade was sunk and the French destroyer Mistral was crippled, while her sister ships, each laden with 500 men, were damaged by near misses. British destroyers Jaguar and Verity were badly damaged but escaped the harbour. Two trawlers disintegrated in the attack. Later, the passenger steamer  sank with 600 men aboard at the pier but the men were able to get off. The paddle steamer  suffered a direct hit, caught fire, and sank with severe casualties. Of the five major German attacks, just two were contested by RAF fighters; the British lost 16 fighters in nine patrols. German losses amounted to 11 Ju 87s destroyed or damaged.

On 30 May, Churchill received word that all British divisions were now behind the defensive lines, along with more than half of the French First Army. With the docks in the harbour rendered unusable by German air attacks, senior naval officer Captain (later Admiral) William Tennant initially ordered men to be evacuated from the beaches. When this proved too slow, he re-routed the evacuees to two long stone and concrete breakwaters, called the east and west moles, as well as the beaches. The moles were not designed to dock ships, but despite this, the majority of troops rescued from Dunkirk were taken off this way. Almost 200,000 troops embarked on ships from the east mole (which stretched nearly a mile out to sea) over the next week. James Campbell Clouston, pier master on the east mole, organised and regulated the flow of men along the mole into the waiting ships. Once more, low clouds kept Luftwaffe activity to a minimum. Nine RAF patrols were mounted, with no German formation encountered. The following day, the Luftwaffe sank one transport and damaged 12 others for 17 losses; the British claimed 38 kills, which is disputed. The RAF and Fleet Air Arm lost 28 aircraft.

The next day, an additional 53,823 men were embarked, including the first French soldiers. Lord Gort and 68,014 men were evacuated on 31 May, leaving Major-General Harold Alexander in command of the rearguard. A further 64,429 Allied soldiers departed on 1 June, before the increasing air attacks prevented further daylight evacuation. The British rearguard of 4,000 men left on the night of 2–3 June. An additional 75,000 French troops were retrieved over the nights of 2–4 June, before the operation finally ended. The remainder of the rearguard, 40,000 French troops, surrendered on 4 June.

Of the total 338,226 soldiers, several hundred were unarmed Indian mule handlers on detachment from the Royal Indian Army Service Corps, forming four of the six units of Force K-6 transport. Cypriot muleteers were also present. Three units were successfully evacuated and one captured. Also present at Dunkirk were a small number of French Senegalese soldiers and Moroccans.

Navy

Evacuation routes

Three routes were allocated to the evacuating vessels. Route X, although the safest from shore batteries, travelled through a particularly heavily mined portion of the Channel. The route was safest from surface attacks, but the nearby minefields and sandbanks meant it could not be used at night. Here, after making an approximately 135-degree turn, the ships sailed west to the North Goodwin Lightship and headed south around the Goodwin Sands to Dover. Ships on Route Y were the most likely to be attacked by German surface vessels, submarines, and the Luftwaffe.

Ships

The Royal Navy provided the anti-aircraft cruiser HMS Calcutta, 39 destroyers, and many other craft. The Merchant Navy supplied passenger ferries, hospital ships, and other vessels. Britain's Belgian, Dutch, Canadian, Polish, and French allies provided vessels as well. Admiral Ramsay arranged for around a thousand copies to be made of the required charts, had buoys laid around the Goodwin Sands and down to Dunkirk, and organised the flow of shipping. Larger ships such as destroyers were able to carry about 900 men per trip. The soldiers mostly travelled on the upper decks for fear of being trapped below if the ship sank. After the loss on 29 May of 19 British and French navy ships plus three of the larger requisitioned vessels, the Admiralty withdrew their eight best destroyers for the future defence of the country.

Little ships

A wide variety of small vessels from all over the south of England were pressed into service to aid in the Dunkirk evacuation. They included speedboats, Thames vessels, car ferries, pleasure craft, and many other types of small craft. The most useful proved to be the motor lifeboats, which had a reasonably good capacity and speed. Some boats were requisitioned without the owner's knowledge or consent. Agents of the Ministry of Shipping, accompanied by a naval officer, scoured the Thames for likely vessels, had them checked for seaworthiness, and took them downriver to Sheerness, where naval crews were to be placed aboard. Due to shortages of personnel, many small craft crossed the Channel with civilian crews.

The first of the "little ships" arrived at Dunkirk on 28 May. In many cases, personnel would abandon their boat upon reaching a larger ship, and subsequent evacuees had to wait for boats to drift ashore with the tide before they could make use of them. In most areas on the beaches, soldiers queued up with their units and patiently awaited their turn to leave. But at times, panicky soldiers had to be warned off at gunpoint when they attempted to rush to the boats out of turn. In addition to ferrying out on boats, soldiers at De Panne and Bray-Dunes constructed improvised jetties by driving rows of abandoned vehicles onto the beach at low tide, anchoring them with sandbags, and connecting them with wooden walkways.

Aftermath

Analysis

Before the operation was completed, the prognosis had been gloomy, with Churchill warning the House of Commons on 28 May to expect "hard and heavy tidings". Subsequently, Churchill referred to the outcome as a miracle, and the British press presented the evacuation as a "disaster turned to triumph" so successfully that Churchill had to remind the country in a speech to the House of Commons on 4 June that "we must be very careful not to assign to this deliverance the attributes of a victory. Wars are not won by evacuations." Andrew Roberts comments that the confusion over the Dunkirk evacuation is illustrated by two of the best books on it being called Strange Defeat and Strange Victory.

The 51st (Highland) Infantry Division was cut off south of the Somme, by the German "race to the sea", in addition to the 1st Armoured Division and a host of logistical and labour troops. Some of the latter had been formed into the improvised Beauman Division. At the end of May, further elements of two divisions began deploying to France with the hope of establishing a Second BEF. The majority of the 51st (Highland) Infantry Division was forced to surrender on 12 June. However, almost 192,000 Allied personnel, including 144,000 British, were evacuated through various French ports from 15 to 25 June under the codename Operation Aerial. Remaining British forces under the French Tenth Army as Norman Force retreated towards Cherbourg. The Germans marched into Paris on 14 June and France surrendered eight days later.

The more than 100,000 French troops evacuated from Dunkirk were quickly and efficiently shuttled to camps in various parts of south-western England, where they were temporarily lodged before being repatriated. British ships ferried French troops to Brest, Cherbourg, and other ports in Normandy and Brittany, although only about half of the repatriated troops were redeployed against the Germans before the surrender of France. For many French soldiers, the Dunkirk evacuation represented only a few weeks' delay before being killed or captured by the German army after their return to France. Of the French soldiers evacuated from France in June 1940, about 3,000 joined Charles de Gaulle's Free French army in Britain.

In France, the unilateral British decision to evacuate through Dunkirk rather than counter-attack to the south, and the perceived preference of the Royal Navy for evacuating British forces at the expense of the French, led to some bitter resentment. According to Churchill, French Admiral François Darlan originally ordered that the British forces should receive preference, but on 31 May, he intervened at a meeting in Paris to order that the evacuation should proceed on equal terms and that the British would form the rearguard. In fact, the 35,000 men who finally surrendered after covering the final evacuations were mostly French soldiers of the 2nd Light Mechanized and the 68th Infantry Divisions. Their resistance allowed the evacuation effort to be extended to 4 June, on which date another 26,175 Frenchmen were transported to England.

The evacuation was presented to the German public as an overwhelming and decisive German victory. On 5 June 1940, Hitler stated, "Dunkirk has fallen! 40,000 French and English troops are all that remains of the formerly great armies. Immeasurable quantities of materiel have been captured. The greatest battle in the history of the world has come to an end." Oberkommando der Wehrmacht (the German armed forces high command) announced the event as "the greatest annihilation battle of all time".

Casualties

During the entire campaign, from 10 May until the armistice with France on 22 June, the BEF suffered 68,000 casualties. This included 3,500 killed and 13,053 wounded. Almost all of the 445 British tanks despatched to France were abandoned.

Six British and three French destroyers were sunk, along with nine other major vessels. In addition, 19 destroyers were damaged. Over 200 British and Allied sea craft were sunk, with a similar number damaged. The Royal Navy's most significant losses in the operation were six destroyers:
 , sunk by air attack at Dunkirk on 29 May
 , sunk by a torpedo from the E-boat S-30 on 29 May

The French Navy lost three destroyers:
 , mined off Nieuport on 30 May
 , sunk by the E-boats S-23 and S-26 on 31 May
 Le Foudroyant, sunk by air attack off the beaches on 1 June

The RAF lost 145 aircraft, of which at least 42 were Spitfires, while the Luftwaffe lost 156 aircraft in operations during the nine days of Operation Dynamo, including 35 destroyed by Royal Navy ships (plus 21 damaged) during the six days from 27 May to 1 June.

For every seven soldiers who escaped through Dunkirk, one man became a prisoner of war. The majority of these prisoners were sent on forced marches into Germany. Prisoners reported brutal treatment by their guards, including beatings, starvation, and murder. Another complaint was that German guards kicked over buckets of water that had been left at the roadside by French civilians, for the marching prisoners to drink.

Many of the prisoners were marched to the city of Trier, with the march taking as long as 20 days. Others were marched to the river Scheldt and were sent by barge to the Ruhr. The prisoners were then sent by rail to prisoner of war camps in Germany. The majority (those below the rank of corporal) then worked in German industry and agriculture for the remainder of the war.

Those of the BEF who died or were captured and have no known grave are commemorated on the Dunkirk Memorial.

Dunkirk Jack

The St George's Cross defaced with the arms of Dunkirk is the warranted house flag of the Association of Dunkirk Little Ships. It is known as the Dunkirk Jack. The flag may be flown from the jack staff only by civilian vessels that took part in the Dunkirk rescue operation.

Portrayals

Films
 Dunkirk (1958)
 Weekend at Dunkirk (1964)
 Atonement (2007)
 Dunkirk (2017)
 Darkest Hour (2017)

Television
 Dunkirk (2004)

Books
 The Snow Goose: A Story of Dunkirk, a novella by Paul Gallico

See also
 1940 Dunkirk Veterans' Association
 Dunkirk Medal

Notes

References

Bibliography

Further reading

External links

 Spitfires Join the Fighting – aerial battle over Dunkirk
 Official website of Dunkirk memorial and museum
 BBC Archive – Dunkirk Evacuation
 Dunkirk, Operation Dynamo – Battle of Britain 1940
 Nazis invade France Video analysis on WW2History.com
 BBC Archives – J. B. Priestley's 'Postscript' – radio broadcast from 5 June 1940

 
1940 in France
1940 in the United Kingdom
Amphibious operations of World War II
Battle of France
Battles and operations of World War II involving the United Kingdom
Battles in Hauts-de-France
Conflicts in 1940
Evacuations
Evacuation
June 1940 events
May 1940 events
Naval battles and operations of the European theatre of World War II